H.M. Gunasekera was a respected broadcaster with Radio Ceylon and subsequently the Sri Lanka Broadcasting Corporation.

HM, as he was affectionately known as in the station, was a pioneering Sinhala announcer. He read the Sinhala news and presented a range of radio programs over the Commercial Service.

He climbed the management ladder and eventually led the radio station, the oldest in South Asia. He has also chaired some key media conferences in Colombo.

See also
Vernon Corea
 SLBC - creating new waves of history
Eighty Years of Broadcasting in Sri Lanka

External links 
 Sri Lanka Broadcasting Corporation

Gunasekera, H.M.